Xerochlora is a genus of moths in the family Geometridae erected by Alexander Douglas Campbell Ferguson in 1969. All species are known from North America.

Species
Xerochlora viridipallens (Hulst, 1896) Colorado, New Mexico, Arizona, Texas, California
Xerochlora inveterascaria (Swett, 1907) Arizona, Texas
Xerochlora martinaria (Sperry, 1948) Arizona
Xerochlora masonaria (Schaus, 1897) Arizona, New Mexico, Mexico, Guatemala, Costa Rica
Xerochlora mesotheides Ferguson, 1969 Texas, New Mexico, Mexico

References

Hemitheini